András Szász (born 24 January 1994) is a Romanian handballer who plays as a pivot for Dinamo București and the Romania national team.

International honours  
EHF Challenge Cup:
Winner: 2015

References

1994 births
Living people
People from Odorheiu Secuiesc
Romanian male handball players
Romanian sportspeople of Hungarian descent
CS Dinamo București (men's handball) players
Expatriate handball players
Romanian expatriate sportspeople in Hungary